The Howell Trophy or Cellular South Howell Trophy or C Spire Howell Trophy is an award given annually to the best men's college basketball player in the state of Mississippi by the Mississippi Sports Hall of Fame. It is open to players from all four-year colleges in Mississippi, although it has only been won by a non-Division I player once.

The trophy is named after former Mississippi State star Bailey Howell.

Winners and finalists

Trophies won by school

See also
Gillom Trophy - award given annually to the best women's college basketball player in the state of Mississippi by the Mississippi Sports Hall of Fame.
C Spire Ferriss Trophy - award given annually to the best men's college baseball player in the state of Mississippi by the Mississippi Sports Hall of Fame.
Conerly Trophy - an award given annually to the best college football player in the state of Mississippi by the Mississippi Sports Hall of Fame.
Hull Trophy- an award given annually to the best college offensive lineman in Mississippi by the Mississippi Sports Hall of Fame.

References

Alcorn State Braves basketball
Awards established in 2005
Basketball in Mississippi
Belhaven Blazers men's basketball
College basketball trophies and awards in the United States
Delta State Statesmen basketball
Jackson State Tigers basketball
Millsaps Majors men's basketball
Mississippi College Choctaws men's basketball
Mississippi State Bulldogs men's basketball
Mississippi Valley State Delta Devils basketball
Ole Miss Rebels men's basketball
Southern Miss Golden Eagles basketball
William Carey Crusaders